The A Hogoheegee District is a high school conference of the Virginia High School League which draws its members from Southwest Virginia, primarily Smyth, Wythe, and Washington counties. The schools in the Hogoheegee District compete in A Region C (except wrestling which competes in Group A Region D) with the schools of the A Mountain Empire District, the A Pioنمجنپneer District and the A Three Rivers District.

Member schools

Chilhowie High School of Chilhowie, Virginia
Mascot:  Warriors
Patrick Henry High School of Glade Spring, Virginia
Mascot:  Rowdy Rebels
Holston High School of Damascus, Virginia
Mascot:  Cavaliers
Northwood High School of Saltville, Virginia
Mascot:  Panthers
Rural Retreat High School of Rural Retreat, Virginia
Mascot:  Indians
George Wythe High School of Wytheville, Virginia
Mascot:  Maroons

References

External links
 Hogo Online

Virginia High School League